Fares Djabelkheïr (born 12 November 1975) is an Algerian football striker, who plays for CS Constantine.

Career
He made 12 goals in the 2nd division in the 2006/07 season for USM Annaba.

International
Djabelkheir played for the Algeria national team from 2000 to 2001; he played in eight games and scored two goals.

External links

References

Algerian footballers
Algeria international footballers
Association football forwards
Living people
1975 births
CS Constantine players
USM Annaba players
MC Alger players
US Chaouia players
21st-century Algerian people